The Realme 5 is a smartphone from the Indian/Chinese company Realme.

Specifications

Hardware
The Realme 5 uses the 64-bit Qualcomm Snapdragon 665 AIE SoC with an octa core processor capable of running at 2.0 GHz max and the Adreno 610 GPU. It is powered by a 5000mAh high-capacity battery. The front features a 6.5-inch HD+ (720x1600) display with Gorilla Glass 3 protection. The device has three models available: 3 GB RAM/32GB storage, 4 GB RAM/64 GB storage or 4 GB RAM/128 GB storage. It supports memory expansion up to 256GB via the microSD card slot.

Camera
Realme 5 has a quad camera setup that includes a 12-megapixel primary sensor with f/1.8 aperture. The second camera is an 8-megapixel ultra-wide sensor, whereas the third and fourth cameras are 2-megapixel sensors for depth and macro mode. The front camera is a 13-megapixel sensor and it has an AI beauty mode. The cameras are AI-enabled with scene detection to capture better photos.

Software 
The Realme 5 is equipped with ColorOS 6.0.1 based on Android 9.0 (Pie) operating system, and has a customized spatial design and close-to-native interaction mode exclusive to Realme. Realme has developed the Dirac Power Sound small speaker sound quality optimization technology jointly with Dirac Research AB to enhance the audio.

Realme 5i
The Realme 5i was released in January 2020. It is similar to the base Realme 5, but has an 8 MP camera at the front and a different back design. The price of the base model of Realme 5i is the same as the base model of the Realme 5, starting at ₹11,999. The Realme 5i has 64 GB internal storage with 3 GB RAM. The 5 and 5i are both upgradeable to Android 10.

References

Realme mobile phones
Phablets
Android (operating system) devices
Mobile phones introduced in 2019
Mobile phones with multiple rear cameras
Mobile phones with 4K video recording
Discontinued smartphones